Callhyccoda is a genus of moths of the family Noctuidae erected by Emilio Berio in 1935.

Species
Callhyccoda indecora Hacker, 2019 Sierra Leone
Callhyccoda mirei Herbulot & Viette, 1952 Chad, Ethiopia, Somalia, Djibouti, Arabia
Callhyccoda namibiensis Hacker, 2019 Namibia
Callhyccoda nigrofalcata Hacker, 2019 Tanzania
Callhyccoda ochrata Hacker, Fiebig & Stadie, 2019 Uganda
Callhyccoda paolii (Berio, 1937) Somalia, Ethiopia
Callhyccoda viriditrina Berio, 1935 Sudan, Somalia, Ethiopia, Kenya

References

Hadeninae